Bhawale is a village in the Thane district of Maharashtra, India. It is located in the Bhiwandi taluka. The Apsan Canine Resort is located here.

Demographics 

According to the 2011 census of India, Bhawale has 133 households. The effective literacy rate (i.e. the literacy rate of population excluding children aged 6 and below) is 76.56%.

References 

Villages in Bhiwandi taluka